The Arctic reindeer (Rangifer tarandus eogroenlandicus), properly known as the East Greenland caribou, was a subspecies of the reindeer (or the caribou in North America) that once lived in eastern Greenland. It has been extinct since 1900.

Archaeologists have found bones of small caribou the size of Peary caribou, Rangifer arcticus pearyi, throughout Greenland in the Illinoian-Wisconsin interglacial and through the LGM and early Holocene (Meldgaard 1986).  Degerbøl (1957) described the East Greenland caribou (reindeer), R. t. eogroenlandicus, a small caribou that became extinct about 1900, from a relict enclave in north-eastern Greenland (see Figure 2 in Harding, 2022). However, Anderson (1946) thought that the small caribou that were occasionally found in northwest Greenland (and by implication, throughout Greenland in prehistoric times) were Peary caribou. Bennike (1988), comparing bones and noting that Peary caribou have been documented crossing Nares Strait to Greenland, doubted that pearyi and eogroenlandicus were subspecifically distinct. That Peary caribou shared certain mtDNA haplotypes and morphological similarities with it (Kvie et al. 2016)  casts further doubt on the validity of R. t. eogroenlandicus. Inuit Qaujimajatuqangit (traditional or community knowledge) records that Peary caribou do, occasionally, cross to Greenland.

The (West) Greenland caribou is larger and darker and not referable to either R. a. pearyi or R. t. eogroenlandicus.

References

Reindeer
Mammal extinctions since 1500
Fauna of Greenland